is a -high cinder cone volcano in the Izu-Tobu volcano field of Itō, Shizuoka, Japan. At the independent peak, the yearly mountain burning that been performed for more than 700 years is carried out in the early spring, so it is often covered with annual plants and is a symbol of Itō. The mountain is designated as a national natural monument and part of Fuji-Hakone-Izu National Park.

Gallery

External links 
The story of the land of Izu pages 82-87 in Japanese - Masato Koyama , Shizuoka University
Mount Ōmuro Geosite - Izu Peninsula Geopark
Mount Ōmuro Geosite -  Japanese site differs from above.

References 

Mountains of Shizuoka Prefecture
Fuji-Hakone-Izu National Park
Volcanoes of Shizuoka Prefecture